Ministry of Public Service may refer to:

 Ministry of Public Service (Uganda)
 Ministry of Public Service (Zimbabwe)